Taboo is a word, guessing, and party game published by Parker Brothers in 1989 (subsequently purchased by Hasbro). The objective of the game is for a player to have their partners guess the word on the player's card without using the word itself or five additional words listed on the card.

The game is similar to Catch Phrase, also from Hasbro, in which a player tries to get their teammates to guess words using verbal clues.

From 2003, a TV game show adaptation ran on TNN, hosted by Chris Wylde.

Equipment
 A large number of cards with a word to guess and five taboo words that may not be spoken by the clue-giver
 Tray for holding cards
 Timer (in the form of a one-minute hourglass)
 Buzzer or squeaker
 Pencil and paper for scorekeeping

Some early editions included a board to track progress (as shown in the photo on this page).

In 1990, Hasbro sold packs of additional words, but they are no longer in production.

The second edition of the game, produced in 1994, has a round, pink squeaker, or hooter, instead of a buzzer, as do the 1993 and 1990 editions.

Taboo Junior, the game for younger players, includes a purple squeaker, as do a few of the other editions from 1996 and 2002 as well as 2012.

Rules
An even number of players from four to ten sit alternating around in a circle.  Players take turns as the "giver", who attempts to prompt their teammates to guess as many keywords as possible in the allotted time.  However, each card also has "taboo" (forbidden) words listed which may not be spoken. Should the giver say one, a "censor" on the opposing team hits the buzzer and the giver must move on to the next word.  For example, the giver might have to get their team to deduce the word "baseball" without offering the words "sport", "game", "pastime", "hitter", "pitcher", or "baseball" itself as clues. The giver may not say a part of a "taboo" word; for example, using "base" in "baseball" is taboo. Nor may they use a form of a word; for example, if the word was "wedding" and the taboo words are "marriage", "bride", "groom", "nuptials", or "honeymoon", the words "marry" and "bridal" would not be allowed.  The giver may only use speech to prompt their teammates; gestures, sounds (e.g., barking), or drawings are not allowed.  Singing is permitted, provided the singer is singing words rather than humming or whistling a tune.  The giver's hints may rhyme with a taboo word, or be an abbreviation of a taboo word.

While the giver is prompting the teammates, they may make as many guesses as they want with no penalties for wrong guesses. Once the team correctly guesses the word exactly as written on the card, the giver moves on to the next word, trying to get as many words as possible in the allotted time.  When time runs out, play passes to the next adjacent player of the other team.  The playing team receives one point for correct guesses and one penalty point if "taboo" words are spoken.

Variations

1989 edition
1990 edition with pink hooter
1993 edition with pink hooter
1994 edition with pink hooter
1996 edition with pink hooter
1999 10th anniversary edition
Bible Taboo
Celebrity Taboo
Platinum edition electronic Taboo
Taboo Jewish Edition
Taboo Junior
Taboo for Kids
The Big Taboo
Taboo Body Language
Taboo Quick Draw
Taboo Singaporean Version
2002 edition with purple squeaker
2003 edition with red squeaker
2009 20th anniversary edition
2011 All New version with new clues and a "game changing" die
2013 edition with "game changing" die
Taboo Buzz'd

References

Board games introduced in 1989
Guessing games
Milton Bradley Company games
Party board games
Party games
Word board games